Nikola Milojević (born 19 June 1995) is a Serbian professional tennis player.
Milojević has a career high ATP singles ranking of No. 125, which he achieved on 21 February 2022. He also achieved a career high ATP doubles ranking of No. 252 on 18 February 2019. He reached his highest ranking of no. 1 in ITF Junior rankings on 7 January 2013.

Career

2014: ATP debut
Milojević was a fifth player on a Serbian Davis Cup team in the first round tie against United States in the 2010 Davis Cup as well as a first round tie against Switzerland in 2014 and didn't play in any match. 

Milojević made his ATP main draw debut as a wildcard at 2014 Düsseldorf Open, where he defeated Mirza Bašić in the first round before losing to eventual finalist, Ivo Karlović, in the second round.

2017: Three Challengers finals, Top 150 debut
He was also invited for a semifinal clash against France in 2017, but instead chose to play in a Challenger tournament in order to improve his ATP ranking. He reached the top 150 on 2 October 2017.

2018-19: Davis Cup debut, First & Second Challenger titles
In February 2018, he finally made his Davis Cup debut, partnered with another debutant, Miljan Zekić, in a doubles match against the USA, losing 7–6(3), 2–6, 5–7, 4–6 in the first round.

In June 2018, Milojević won his first Challenger title in Fergana, Uzbekistan.

Milojević partnered with Danilo Petrović for the 2018 Davis Cup World Group Play-offs vs. India in September. They defeated Rohan Bopanna/Saketh Myneni in straight sets to help secure Serbia a decisive 3–0 lead after second day's play. (Serbia eventually won the tie 4–0)

In August 2019, he won his third Challenger title at the 2019 Svijany Open in Liberec, Czechia.

2020-21: ATP Cup champion & Major debut & first win, Challenger Third title & two finals 
In January 2020, he was part of Serbian team that won the Inaugural ATP Cup by defeating Spain in the final.

In September 2020, Milojević reached the second round on his debut as a qualifier in a Grand Slam main draw at the 2020 French Open, where he won his first match against fellow Serbian Filip Krajinović in four sets 6–4, 3–6, 6–3, 6–1.

After winning his third Challenger title at the 2021 Zadar Open in Croatia by defeating Bulgarian Dimitar Kuzmanov, Milojević reached his best career-high ranking of No. 129 on 5 April 2021.

2022: Australian Open debut, ATP quarterfinal and Top 125 debut
In January, Milojević qualified into the main draw of the 2022 Australian Open for the first time at this Major, but lost to Mackenzie McDonald in the opening round. After the Australian tour, he reached the quarterfinals as a lucky loser at the Córdoba Open where he lost to Juan Ignacio Londero. As a result he reached the top 125 on 21 February 2022.

Singles performance timeline 

Current through the 2023 Australian Open.

Team competition finals: 1 (1–0)

Challenger and Futures finals

Singles: 33 (15 titles, 18 runner–ups)

Notes

References

External links
 
 
 

1995 births
Living people
Tennis players from Belgrade
Serbian male tennis players